Prince Faisal bin Farhan bin Abdullah bin Faisal bin Farhan Al Saud (Arabic فيصل بن فرحان آل سعود, DMG Faiṣal b. Farḥān Āl Saʿūd; born 1 November 1974 in Frankfurt am Main) is a Saudi Arabian diplomat and politician and a member of the House of Saud. Prince Faisal has served as the current Saudi ambassador to Germany since 27 March 2019. He has also served as foreign minister of Saudi Arabia since 23 October 2019, when he was appointed to that position by a royal decree issued by King Salman. Prince Faisal was born in Frankfurt, West Germany and spent a part of his childhood and young adulthood in that country, which is why he speaks fluent German according to German news media.

Early life and political career
Prince Faisal is a member of the Saudi royal family. A son of Prince Farhan bin Abdullah Al Saud, he was born on 1 November 1974 in West Germany and was educated in the US. He served as an adviser at the Saudi Arabian Embassy in the US from 2017 to 2019.

Faisal has held senior positions in Saudi and international companies, primarily the aerospace and weapons sector. He was, until at least his appointment as ambassador to Germany, a director of the arms company Saudi Arabian Military Industries (SAMI). He then worked for the Saudi ambassador to the United States. 

As an expert on the defense industry, he also chaired a US-Saudi joint venture with the aerospace company Boeing. Prince Faisal also served as an adviser to the Royal Court of Saudi Arabia.

In November 2017, Saudi Arabia withdrew its then ambassador to Germany, Khalid bin Bandar bin Sultan Al Saud, in protest of a statement made by Sigmar Gabriel, the German Foreign Minister at that time. Gabriel had clearly criticized the active influence of the kingdom on the political-power constellation in Lebanon. After nearly a year of diplomatic crisis and vacancy of the ambassador position, Saudi Arabia sent its ambassador back to Berlin, but he was replaced by Faisal bin Farhan on 27 March 2019. Saudi dissidents living in Germany were not pleased with the appointment of Faisal. The dissident Khalid bin Farhan al-Saud, a distant relative of the new ambassador, feared that the diplomat could also pressure opposition representatives. He told Deutsche Welle that he did not rule out that Faisal bin Farhan had been sent to Germany to persecute Saudi dissidents living in the country. Faisal has a good relationship with the kingdom's powerful crown prince, Mohammed bin Salman.

On 23 October 2019, he was appointed as Minister of Foreign Affairs of Saudi Arabia. 

On 19 August 2020, Foreign Minister Faisal said the peace agreement between Israel and the United Arab Emirates could be seen as positive, but Saudi Arabia would not normalize relations until peace is signed with the Palestinians, hopefully within the framework of the Arab Peace Initiative.

Saudi Arabia is looking to schedule a fifth round of direct talks with rival Iran despite a “lack of substantive progress” in previous rounds, the kingdom’s foreign minister has said at the Munich Security Conference on Saturday, February 19 2022.

See also
 Council of Ministers of Saudi Arabia

References

 

20th-century Saudi Arabian businesspeople
21st-century Saudi Arabian businesspeople
20th-century Saudi Arabian politicians
Saudi Arabian people of German descent
1974 births
Ambassadors of Saudi Arabia to Germany
Foreign ministers of Saudi Arabia
Living people